Hillsboro is an unincorporated community in Coffee County, Tennessee, United States, that was treated as a census-designated place for the 2010 U.S. Census. The population was 450 as of the 2010 census.  The community is concentrated around the intersection of U.S. Route 41 and Tennessee State Route 127, between Manchester to the northwest and Monteagle to the southeast.  The Cumberland Plateau rises to the east, and Arnold Air Force Base lies to the west.

Demographics

References

Census-designated places in Coffee County, Tennessee
Census-designated places in Tennessee
Unincorporated communities in Tennessee